
Gmina Zagórz is an urban-rural gmina (administrative district) in Sanok County, Subcarpathian Voivodeship, in south-eastern Poland.

Ethnically the population of the region includes Poles and Pogorzans.

The gmina contains part of the protected area called Cisna-Wetlina Landscape Park.

Villages
Apart from the town of Zagórz, Gmina Zagórz contains the villages and settlements of Brzozowiec, Czaszyn, Kalnica, Łukowe, Mokre, Morochów, Olchowa, Poraż, Średnie Wielkie, Tarnawa Dolna, Tarnawa Górna and Zahutyń.

Neighbouring gminas
Gmina Zagórz is bordered by the town of Sanok and by the gminas of Baligród, Bukowsko, Komańcza, Lesko and Sanok.

References
Polish official population figures 2006

Zagorz
Sanok County